The Henry and Cornelia Ford Farm is a historic farmstead in rural Phillips County, Arkansas. It is at 1335 County Road 249, northeast of Lexa. The main house is an architecturally undistinguished vernacular structure with a porch extending across its main facade. The barn, northwest of the house, is finished in board-and-batten siding. Also on the property area shed and an artist's studio. The farmstead was built c. 1950, in part with assistance from the Federal Housing Administration, which had previously visited the Ford's farm to see how the African-American couple had established a financially self-sufficient operation. It is a well-preserved and maintained example of a small mid-20th-century farmstead.

The farm was listed on the National Register of Historic Places in 2006.

See also
National Register of Historic Places listings in Phillips County, Arkansas

References

Buildings and structures completed in 1950
Buildings and structures in Phillips County, Arkansas
National Register of Historic Places in Phillips County, Arkansas
Farms on the National Register of Historic Places in Arkansas